A list of Portuguese films that were first released in 2009.

See also
2009 in Portugal

References

2009
Lists of 2009 films by country or language
2009 in Portugal